Seaham Hall Dene railway station (also referred to as Hall Dene, Seaham Dene or Seaham Hall) was a private railway station that served Seaham Hall, the then a home of the Marquess of Londonderry close to the town of Seaham, County Durham, England from 1875 to 1925 on the Durham Coast Line.

History 

In 1854 the Londonderry Railway opened the Londonderry, Seaham and Sunderland Railway to link its network of colliery railways to the newly constructed South Dock in Sunderland due to the lack of capacity in Seaham Harbour. An additional station was opened in 1875 to serve the home of the Londonderry family who had provided much of the funding for the line.

The station was situated north of Seaham station (originally Seaham Colliery station) and south of Ryhope East station.

In 1879 the North Eastern Railway closed Hendon station to be replaced by Sunderland Central station and so all LS&SR services were diverted into the new station. The LS&SR did, however, remain independent until the Londonderry Railway agreed to sell its Seaham to Sunderland route to the North Eastern Railway in the Act of 30 July 1900 though this sale did not include Hall Dene station which remained under the ownership of the Marquess. The NER took over operation of the route on 6 October 1900 and then, on 1 April 1905 opened an extension of it along the coast to West Hartlepool.

As part of the 1900 Act that enabled the NER to purchase the Seaham to Sunderland line, the Marquess retained the power "to stop other than express trains within reasonable limits" although this privilege was only used four times between 1900 and 1923. After the NER was amalgamated into the London & North Eastern Railway in the grouping of 1923, the LNER requested that this privilege be abolished and consequentially the station ceased to be used from 1 March 1925.

The original station building remains and has been convert to a private house.

References

External links 

Disused railway stations in County Durham
Former North Eastern Railway (UK) stations
Former private railway stations
Railway stations in Great Britain opened in 1875
Railway stations in Great Britain closed in 1925
1875 establishments in England
1925 disestablishments in England
Seaham